Rinck is a surname. Notable people with the surname include:

Christian Heinrich Rinck (1770–1846), German composer and organist
Henri Rinck (1870–1952), French chess composer
Josef Wilhelm Rinck von Baldenstein (1704–1762), Prince-Bishop of Basel 
Wilhelm Friedrich Rinck (1793–1854), German Protestant priest, biblical scholar, and palaeographer